François Villon is a 1945 French historical drama film directed by André Zwoboda and starring Serge Reggiani, Jean-Roger Caussimon and Henri Crémieux. It portrays the life of the fifteenth century writer François Villon. The film was inspired by the play If I Were King by Justin Huntly McCarthy.

Cast
 Serge Reggiani as François Villon 
 Jean-Roger Caussimon as Le grand écolier 
 Henri Crémieux as Maître Piédoux  
 Pierre Dargout as Thibaud  
 Guy Decomble as Denisot  
 Claudine Dupuis as Huguette du Hainaut  
 Jacques-Henry Duval as Tuvache  
 Renée Faure as Catherine de Vauselles  
 Gabrielle Fontan as La Villonne  
 Micheline Francey as Guillemette  
 Gustave Gallet as Guillaume de Villon  
 Léon Larive as Turgis  
 Frédéric Mariotti as Arnoulet
 Albert Michel as Le paysan accusé 
 Albert Montigny as Ratier  
 Jean Morel as Alain 
 Denise Noël as Margot 
 Julienne Paroli as La mère  
 Marcel Pérès as Le Goliard  
 Albert Rémy as Perrot  
 Michel Vitold as Noël, le borgne 
 Jean Carmet as Un compagnon de François

References

Bibliography 
 Harty, Kevin J. The Reel Middle Ages: American, Western and Eastern European, Middle Eastern, and Asian Films about Medieval Europe. McFarland, 1999.

External links 
 

1945 films
1940s historical drama films
Films about François Villon
French historical drama films
1940s French-language films
Films directed by André Zwoboda
Films set in the 15th century
Cultural depictions of François Villon
French black-and-white films
Cultural depictions of Louis XI of France
1945 drama films
1940s French films